Fabio Vullo (born 1 September 1964) is a retired Italian volleyball player.

Vullo, standing at 1.98 m for 87 kg, was born in Massa, and played as setter (although at the beginning of his long career was employed also as hitter). 
Vullo revolutionized the role of the setter, because he was, along with the Dutch Peter Blangé, one of the first setters in the world capable to set the ball from a greater height and to be dangerous in attack, block and serve. 
Before Vullo and Blangé, most of the setters were much shorter (usually not taller than 1.90 m), but nowadays it is common to see setters who are over 2.00m tall, and are effective blockers and servers.

Despite being unanimously considered one of world's best setters ever, Vullo was rarely capped by the Italian national team, due to his conflictual relationship with coach Julio Velasco. He therefore did not take part in much of the victories of that team during the 1990s: with the Italian national team, he only won one World League, in 1992.

On the other hand, Vullo had a long and very successful career at club level in the Italian Serie A1: he won 8 Italian titles, 7 Champions Leagues (4 with Modena, 3 with Ravenna), one European Champions cup, and other less important trophies, both in Italy and in Europe.

Vullo stopped playing in 2004, and is currently working as TV commentator.

Clubs

References

External links
 
 
 
 

1964 births
Living people
Sportspeople from the Province of Massa-Carrara
Italian men's volleyball players
Volleyball players at the 1984 Summer Olympics
Volleyball players at the 1992 Summer Olympics
Olympic volleyball players of Italy
Olympic bronze medalists for Italy
Olympic medalists in volleyball
Medalists at the 1984 Summer Olympics